Pterolophia penicillata is a species of beetle in the family Cerambycidae. It was described by Francis Polkinghorne Pascoe in 1862, originally under the genus Praonetha.

References

penicillata
Beetles described in 1862